Deborah Joy may refer to:

 Deborah Joy Cheetham (born 1964), Aboriginal Australian soprano, actor, composer and playwright
 Deborah Joy Corey (born 1958), Canadian writer
 Deborah Joy LeVine, American television writer and producer